Albanian Canadians are Canadians of full or partial Albanian ancestry and heritage in Canada. They trace their ancestry to the territories with a large Albanian population in the Balkans among others to Albania, Italy, Kosovo, North Macedonia and Montenegro. They are adherents of different religions and are predominantly Christians, Muslims as well as Irreligious.

In 2016, there were 36,185 Canadian citizens of Albanian descent living in Canada. The Albanian Canadians are predominantly distributed in the provinces of Ontario and Quebec followed by growing communities in Alberta and British Columbia.

History 

The Albanian migration in Canada began in the early 20th century, when the first Albanians emigrated to this country. This emigration was due to internal uprisings that occurred in their country of origin. However, after World War II (1939–1945) very few Albanians moved to Canada, and most arrived from the former Yugoslavia, due to a communist regime in Albania, which prohibited foreign travel. Most Albanians who emigrated to Canada country after the war decided to settle in Montreal or Toronto. There were also some Albanian workers who lived in Calgary and Ontario (e.g.
Peterborough).  Despite this migration, by 1986, less of 1,500 Albanians emigrated to Canada. However, in 1991, the Albanian community  exceeded the 2,500 people. In the 1990s, the economic and political upheavals experienced in the Balkans as a whole (including in Albania and Kosovo) led to significant Albanian migration abroad, including to Canada. This is when the Albanian migration to Canada reached its peak.

At the beginning of the 21st century, a new war prompted a second wave of immigration of Albanians in Canada. This armed conflict was a clash between Albanian and Serb authorities, both military and police, which caused many Albanians to feel compelled to leave Kosovo as refugees, many of them emigrating to Canada. Thus, in 1999, the Government of Canada established a residency program to allow the settlement of 7,000 refugees of Kosovar Albanian origin.

As with professionals from other countries, there has been a large influx of young Albanian professionals who immigrate to Canada for a better life.

According to the 2006 census, there were 22,395 people of ethnic Albanian descent living in Canada, most of whom 11,385 (51%) lived in Toronto. Hamilton, Kitchener, London, Ottawa and Peterborough are areas elsewhere in Ontario which also have Albanian communities.

Demographics 

As of the 2016 census, 36,185 Canadian residents, or roughly 0.11% of the population of Canada, stated they had Albanian ancestry. Approximately 72% of the Albanian population reside in the province of Ontario followed by Quebec and Alberta. The majority of the Albanian population were predominantly concentrated in the metropolitan areas and agglomerations of Toronto and Montréal.

There are also 2,870 Canadian residents, or roughly 0.01% of the population of Canada, who stated that they had Kosovar ancestry. They are geographically distributed as well as in the particular regions with Albanian populations such as in Ontario, Quebec and Alberta.

Culture

Organizations 

Albanian Canadians founded many organizations in Canada, to maintain their language, traditions and culture. Some of these association have also helped other immigrants adapt to Canadian life. Many of these partnerships are in Toronto, a major city of the Albanian population. In this city, the largest associations are the Albanian Muslim Society of Toronto (founded in 1954) and the Albanian-Canadian Community Association of Toronto (founded in 1990). There are also other notable organizations, such as the Albanian Canadian Organization of Ottawa. www.albcanorg.ca

Notable people 
 Klaidi Cela - footballer
 Peter Dajia - shot putter
 Max Domi - hockey player
 Tie Domi - hockey player
 Arlind Ferhati - footballer
 Elvir Gigolaj - footballer
 Ana Golja - actress and singer
 Eric Margolis - Journalist
 Kadrush Radogoshi - writer
 Agim Sherifi - footballer
 Markela Bejleri - Albanian footballer
 Arber Xhekaj - Hockey Player

See also 
 European Canadians
 Albanian diaspora
 Albania-Canada relations

References 

European Canadian
Albanian
 
Canadian